The Lorenzo Mendoza Fleury Science Prize, also known as the "Premio Fundación Empresas Polar" is the most important award offered by the private sector to contemporary scientists from Venezuela who have shown outstanding talent, creativity and productivity during a given period.

History
The prize was created in 1982 by "Fundación Empresas Polar" and is named after the founder of Empresas Polar, a Venezuelan corporation owning one of the largest breweries in the country but whose operations also include an array of industries, mostly related to food processing and packaging. The award was established as part of the Corporate social responsibility of the group. Every two years since 1983 the prize has been systematically awarded to Venezuelan scientists in the fields of Biology, Physics, Mathematics, Chemistry and their interdisciplines. For each biennial edition, the Board of Directors of Empresas Polar Foundation appoints a Selection Committee composed of seven scientists having extensive academic experience in their respective research fields. This committee then propose candidates, evaluate nominees, select winners, and write and submit the verdict to the Board of Polar Foundation. The selection process evaluates the talent, creativity and productivity of each candidate in their respective specialties. Besides giving public recognition to the awardees, the prize also includes a diploma and a freely spendable amount of cash to each one of them.

Award statistics
Since the prize started its first edition in 1983, there have been 90 awardees, including 15 women, with the following specialties: Biology:32, Physics:21, Mathematics:18 and Chemistry:18.
Awardees have been members of the following institutions:
 Instituto Venezolano de Investigaciones Científicas (IVIC): 31
 Universidad Central de Venezuela (UCV): 18
 Universidad de Los Andes (ULA): 17
 Universidad Simón Bolívar (USB): 13
 Centro de Investigaciones de Astronomia (CIDA): 4
 Universidad de Oriente (UDO): 2
 Universidad de Carabobo (UC): 1
IBM: 1
Intevep: 1
Universidad del Zulia (LUZ): 1
Instituto de Estudios Avanzados (IDEA): 1

Award recipients
The list of scientists who have received the prize is shown below:
I. 1983
 José Luis Ávila Bello
 Reinaldo Di Polo
 Carlos Di Prisco
 Heinz Krentzien
 Miguel Octavio
II. 1985
Miguel Alonso
Rodrigo Arocena
Luis Herrera Cometta
Klaus Jaffé
Ernesto Medina
III. 1987
Gustavo Bruzual
Nuria Calvet Cuni
Carlos Caputo
Gerardo Mendoza
Gustavo Ponce
IV. 1989
Rafael Apitz
Julio Fernández
Claudio Mendoza
Manuel Rieber
Roberto Sánchez Delgado
V. 1991
Anamaría Font Villarroel
Narahari Joshi
Leonardo Mateu
Raúl Padrón
Carlos Schubert
VI. 1993
Miguel Méndez
Ernesto Medina D.
Leonardo Enrique Mora
Fernando Ruette
Benjamín Scharifker
VII. 1995
Luigi Cubeddu
Luis Hernández
Ferdinand Liprandi
Alejandro Müller
Hebertt Sira
VIII. 1997
José Rafael León R.
Carlos G. Rincón Ch.
Egidio L. Romano R.
Antonio R. Tineo Bello
Julio A. Urbina R.
IX. 1999
Luis Báez Duarte
Wilmer Olivares Rivas
Álvaro Restuccia Núñez
Bernardo Rodríguez Iturbe
Víctor Villalba Rojas
X. 2001
Anwar Hasmy
Hugo Leiva
Jesús A. León
Vladimiro Mujica
Irene Pérez Schael
XI. 2003
Sócrates Acevedo
Yosslen Aray
Jesús González
José Rafael López Padrino
Lázaro Recht
XII. Year 2005.
Manuel Bautista, physics
Pedro Berrizbeitia, mathematics
José Bubis, biology
José Luis Paz, chemist
Félix J. Tapia, biology
XIII. Year 2007.
Carlos Uzcátegui, mathematics
María Antonieta Sobrado, biology 
Alejandra Melfo, physics
Gustavo Benaím, biology 
Juan Anacona, chemistry
 XIV. Year 2009.
Mireya Rincón de Goldwasser, chemistry
Stefania Marcantognini, mathematics
 Flor Hélène Pujol, biology
Anna Katherina Vivas Maldonado, astrophysics
 Juan B. De Sanctis, biochemistry
XV. Year 2011.
Carenne Ludeña Cronick, mathematics
César Briceño Ávila, physics
César Lodeiros Seijo, biology
Joaquín Brito Gonzálvez, chemistry
Luis Rincón Hernández, chemistry
XVI. Year 2013.	
Trino Baptista, biology
Ismardo Bonalde, physics
Jimmy Castillo, chemistry
Jon Paul Rodríguez, biology
Víctor Sirvent, mathematics
XVII. Year 2015.
Mario Cosenza (physics, ULA), 
Liliana López (chemistry, UCV), 
Patricia Miloslavich (biology, USB), 
Ramón Pino (mathematics, ULA) 
Fermín Rada (biology, ULA)
XVIII. Year 2017.
Rafael Almeida (chemistry, ULA), 
Gloria Buendía (physics, USB),  
Yamilet Quintana (mathematics, USB) 
Pedro Rada (biology, ULA) 
Wilmer Tezara (biology, UCV)

References

Venezuelan science and technology awards
Awards established in 1982
1982 establishments in Venezuela